Baby Songs is one of the first, and longest-running, American, independent children's home video series. Since 1987, more than 4 million copies of Baby Songs have been sold.

History
In 1985, Amy Weintraub and Brooks McEwan founded the company Backyard Productions, now Backyard Enterprises, Inc., to release Baby Songs. Inspired by the music videos on MTV, Weintraub and McEwan created the first collection of music videos for babies and toddlers.

They partnered with American children's musician Hap Palmer, a recording artist since 1969, to create Baby Songs. The videos often feature Palmer performing either his original songs or adaptations of folk, nursery rhymes and popular songs to live children. The songs are separated by short animated video segments. Baby Songs also released videos without Palmer, often starring other singers (such as John Lithgow's Kid Size Concert). Baby Songs was originally released on VHS by Hi-Tops Video in 1987 and then by Anchor Bay in 1999. In 2003, it was released on VHS and DVD by 20th Century Fox.

The company has released 17 titles on VHS and DVD, and 4 audio compilations.

The videos aired as a segment on the TV program Lunch Box on The Disney Channel.

Video titles
Baby Songs (1987)
More Baby Songs (1987)
Turn On The Music (January 17, 1989) (renamed as "Super Baby Songs")
Even More Baby Songs (later renamed "Baby's Busy Day") (1990)
Baby Songs: John Lithgow's Kid Size Concert (1990)
Baby Songs Presents: Baby Rock (1991) (later renamed "Baby Songs: Rock & Roll")
Baby Songs: Christmas (1991)
Follow Along Songs (1992)
Sing Together (1992)
Baby Songs: Good Night (January 26, 1999)
Baby Songs: ABC, 123, Colors and Shapes (August 17, 1999)
Baby Songs: Animals (February 22, 2000)
Baby Songs: Play Along Songs (September 12, 2000)
Baby Songs: Silly Songs (September 25, 2001)

Awards
 Gold Award, National Association of Parenting Publications Awards, 2001
 "100 Best Children's Products," Dr. Toy, 2001
 Gold Award, Parent's Choice Awards, Spring 2000
 "100 Best Children's Products," Dr. Toy, 1999

References

External links
Baby Songs Official Website

Album series
1980s video albums
1990s video albums
2000s video albums
Children's music albums
Video albums